Year 1290 (MCCXC) was a common year starting on Sunday (link will display the full calendar) of the Julian calendar.

Events 
 By place 

 Europe 
 July 10 – King Ladislaus IV (the Cuman) is assassinated at the castle of Körösszeg (modern Romania). He is succeeded by Andrew III (the Venetian), after an election by Hungarian nobles, who is crowned by Archbishop Lodomer as new ruler of Hungary and Croatia in Székesfehérvár on July 23.
 December 18 – King Magnus III (Birgersson) dies after a 15-year reign. He is succeeded by his 10-year-old son Birger (Magnusson). Although, Sweden is an elective monarchy, Birger had already been appointed heir to the throne in 1284.

 England 
 July 18 – Edict of Expulsion: King Edward I (Longshanks) orders all Jews (at this time probably numbering around 2,000) to leave the country by November 1 (All Saints' Day); on the Hebrew calendar this is Tisha B'Av, a day that commemorates many calamities.
 Quia Emptores, a statute passed by Edward I (Longshanks), puts an end to the practice of subinfeudations. The statute allows land to be sold according to royal approval, as long as the new owner answers directly to his lord or the king.
 September – The 7-year-old Margaret (Maid of Norway), queen-designate and heir to the crown of Scotland, dies en route to the British Isles in Orkney – leading to a succession crisis known as Competitors for the crown of Scotland.
 November 28 – Eleanor of Castile, wife of Edward I (Longshanks), dies while traveling in the North. She has been suffering from illness for some time, and the cold and dampness of the winter months probably aggravate her condition.
 December – Edward I (Longshanks) travels with the body of Eleanor of Castile from Lincoln to London. Remembering his wife, Edward erects a series of crosses at each location that the body rests over night. These are known as the twelve Eleanor crosses.
 Winter – The second of the Statutes of Mortmain are passed during the reign of Edward I (Longshanks), which prevents land from passing into the possession of the Church.

 Levant 
 June – Genoa concludes a new commercial treaty with the Mamluks; five galleys sent by King James II (the Just) join the Venetian Crusader fleet (some 20 ships) on its way to Acre. On board of the fleet are Italian urban militias and mercenary forces under Seneschal Jean I de Grailly, who have fought for the Papal States in the so-called Italian Crusades.
 August – Italian Crusaders massacre Muslim merchants and peasants, and some local Christians in Acre. Some claim it began at a drunken party – others that a European husband found his wife making love to a Muslim. The barons and local knights try to rescue a few Muslims and take them to the safety of the castle, while some ringleaders are arrested.  
 August 30 – Survivors and relatives of the massacre at Acre take bloodstained clothing to Sultan Qalawun (the Victorious) in Cairo, who demands that the leaders of the riot be handed over for trial. But the nobles refuse to send the ringleaders, Qalawun now got legal clearance from the religious authorities in Cairo to break the truce with Crusader states.
 October – Qalawun (the Victorious) orders a general mobilization of the Mamluk forces. In a council, is decided that a peace delegation is sent to Cairo under Guillaume de Beaujeu, Grand Master of the Knights Templar. But Qalawun demands huge compensation for those killed in Acre, and sends a Syrian army to the coast of Palestine, near Caesarea.
 November 10 – Qalawun (the Victorious) dies as the Egyptian Mamluk army sets out for Acre. He is succeeded by his eldest son Al-Ashraf Khalil as ruler of the Mamluk Sultanate. Kahlil orders his allies and tributaries in Syria to prepare for a campaign next spring. Governors and castle commanders are ordered to assemble siege equipment and armor.

 Asia 
 June 13 – Shamsuddin II, Mamluk ruler of the Delhi Sultanate, is murdered and succeeded by Jalal ud-Din Khalji (or Firuz Shah I), founder of the Khalji Dynasty. Ending Mamluk rule and instigating the Khalji Revolution.
 September 27 –  The 6.8  Zhili earthquake affects the province of Zhili in China, with a maximum Mercalli intensity of IX (Violent), killing 7,270–100,000 people.

 By topic 

 Art and Culture 
 June 8 – Beatrice Portinari, muse of the Italian poet Dante Alighieri, dies. In his Divine Comedy (La Divina Commedia), he transforms his memory of Beatrice into an allegory of divine love.

 Climate and Weather 
 Year without winter – An exceptionally rare instance of uninterrupted transition, from autumn to the following spring, in England and the mainland of Western Europe.

 Education 
 March 1 – The University of Coimbra is founded in Lisbon by Denis I (the Poet King). He decrees that Portuguese is the official language of Portugal, replacing classical Latin in that capacity. 

 Literature 
 Dnyaneshwari is written in India. This holy book is a commentary on Bhagvad Gita and is narrated by St. Dnyaneshwar.

Births 
 January 3 – Constance of Portugal, queen consort of Castile (d. 1313)
 January 6 – Otto Bodrugan, English landowner and politician (d. 1331)
 June 23 – Jakushitsu Genkō, Japanese Rinzai master and poet (d. 1367)
 August 4 – Leopold I (the Glorious), German nobleman (d. 1326)
 October 15 – Anne of Bohemia, queen consort of Bohemia (d. 1313)
 December 24 – Khwaju Kermani, Persian poet and mystic (d. 1349)
 Agnes Haakonsdatter, Norwegian noblewoman and princess (d. 1319)
 Andrea Pisano (or Pontedera), Italian sculptor and architect (d. 1348)
 Barlaam of Seminara, Italian cleric, scholar and theologian (d. 1348)
 Beatrice of Silesia, queen of Germany (House of Piast) (d. 1322) 
 Buton Rinchen Drub, Tibetan Buddhist religious leader (d. 1364)
 Daichi Sokei, Japanese Buddhist monk, disciple and poet (d. 1366)
 Giovanni Visconti, Italian cardinal, archbishop and co-ruler (d. 1354)
 Guido Gonzaga, Italian nobleman and knight (condottiero) (d. 1369)
 Hugues Quiéret, French nobleman, admiral and advisor (d. 1340)
 Jacob van Artevelde, Flemish merchant and statesman (d. 1345)
 Jacopo Dondi dell'Orologio, Italian doctor and polymath (d. 1359)
 Johannes de Muris, French mathematician and astronomer (d. 1344)
 John Maltravers, English nobleman, knight and governor (d. 1364)
 John Parricida, German nobleman (House of Habsburg) (d. 1312)
 Jyotirishwar Thakur, Indian playwright, poet and writer (d. 1350)
 Ke Jiusi, Chinese landscape painter and calligrapher (d. 1343)
 Kitabatake Tomoyuki, Japanese nobleman and poet (d. 1332)
 Kujō Fusazane, Japanese nobleman, official and regent (d. 1327)
 Peter of Castile, Spanish nobleman and prince (infante) (d. 1319)
 Pierre Bercheure, French translator and encyclopaedist (d. 1362)
 Rabbenu Yerucham, French rabbi and scholar (posek) (d. 1350)
 Richard de Willoughby, English landowner and politician (d. 1362)
 Rudolf Hesso, German nobleman (House of Zähringen) (d. 1335)
 Sesson Yūbai, Japanese Buddhist monk, priest and poet (d. 1347)
 Theodore I (Palaiologos), Byzantine nobleman and writer (d. 1338)
 Willem van Duvenvoorde, Dutch nobleman and knight (d. 1353)

Deaths 
 January 28 –  Dervorguilla of Galloway, Scottish noblewoman (b. 1210)
 February 3 – Henry XIII, German nobleman, co-ruler and knight (b. 1235)
 March 24 – John dal Bastone, Italian monk, priest and preacher (b. 1200)
 March 26 – John Kirkby, English bishop, vice-chancellor and statesman
 April 26 – Gaston VII (Froissard), French nobleman and knight (b. 1225)
 May 10 – Rudolf II, German nobleman (House of Habsburg) (b. 1270)
 June 8 – Beatrice Portinari, Italian muse of Dante Alighieri (b. 1266)
 June 13 – Shamsuddin II, Mamluk ruler of the Delhi Sultanate (b. 1285)
 June 23 – Henryk IV (the Righteous), High Duke of Poland (b. 1258)
 July 10 – Ladislaus IV (the Cuman), king of Hungary and Croatia (b. 1262)
 September 26 – Margaret (Maid of Norway), queen of Scotland (b. 1283)
 November 10 – Qalawun (the Victorious), Mamluk ruler of Egypt (b. 1222)
 November 28 – Eleanor of Castile, queen consort of England (b. 1241)
 December 18 
 Herman I, German nobleman (House of Henneberg) (b. 1224)
 Magnus III (or I) (Birgersson), king of Sweden (b. 1240)
 December 21 – Gerhard I, German nobleman, knight and regent (b. 1232)
 Adelaide of Auxerre, French noblewoman and ruler (suo jure) (b. 1251)
 Alice de Lusignan, French noblewoman (House of Lusignan) (b. 1236)
 Cecilia Cesarini (or Caecilia), Italian noblewoman and nun (b. 1203) 
 Eison, Japanese Buddhist scholar-monk, disciple and priest (b. 1201)
 Elizabeth the Cuman, queen of Hungary (House of Arpad) (b. 1244)
 Fakhr al-Din Mustawfi, Persian finance minister, advisor and vizier

References